The Acoma Massacre refers to the punitive expedition by Spanish conquistadors at Acoma Pueblo in January 1599 that resulted in the deaths of around 500 Acoma men killed in a three-day battle, along with 300 women and children. Of the remaining Acoma who survived the attack, many were sentenced to 20-year enslavement and 24 suffered amputations.

The massacre was the result of a battle between Spanish colonizers and Native Americans from the Keres Acoma Nation in what is now New Mexico in retaliation for the killing of 12 Spanish soldiers by the Acoma in the previous year.

Background
In the late 1500s the Spanish Crown began ordering conquest expeditions into the territories of Pueblo peoples, areas of which Spain sought to gain control as part of the colonization efforts in so-called New Spain. In 1595 the conquistador Don Juan de Oñate was granted permission from King Philip II to colonize Santa Fe de Nuevo México, the present-day American state of New Mexico.

The early years of Spanish exploits in the area had seen but a few mostly peaceful encounters with the Acoma people, who outnumbered the colonizers in the decades after 1540. However, in 1598, Zutacapan, the Acoma cacique and spiritual leader, learned that the Spanish emissaries intended to conquer Acoma Pueblo by force. Zutacapan also learned that the Spanish plan was to have all the Pueblo people move to a new village in the valley, where they would be living under Spanish rule, working for the Crown under the colonial forced-labor system known as encomiendas. Acoma people would also be forced to convert to Catholicism and forsake their traditional beliefs and practices. Seeking to protect the Pueblo's material and religious integrity, Pueblo leadership decided to prepare to resist Spanish aggression.

Juan de Zaldívar, Oñate's nephew and soldier, was sent to the pueblo to meet with Zutacapan. Upon arriving on December 4, 1598, the Spanish envoy demanded food and shelter for himself and his sixteen men. After being rebuffed, the group reportedly invaded Acoma homes, breaking walls and destroying property in order to take maize and blankets by force, leaving Keres women curled up naked with their children. The Acoma resisted and a fight ensued, leaving Zaldívar and eleven of his men dead.

When Oñate learned of the incident, he ordered Juan's brother, Vicente de Zaldívar, to lead an expedition to punish the Acoma and set an example for other Pueblos. Taking about seventy men, Vincente de Zaldivar left San Juan Pueblo in late December or early January and arrived at Acoma on January 21, 1599.

Battle
The main battle between the Acoma and the Spaniards began the following morning, January 22. For the first two days the Acoma were able to withstand Spanish forces, until Zaldívar developed a plan to breach the Pueblo's defenses using a small cannon. On the third day, Zaldívar and twelve of his men ascended the mesa and opened fire on the Pueblo with the cannon. The Spaniard's heavy artillery was incomparable to the Acoma's arsenal. A large fire engulfed many Acoma homes during the battle. The conquistadors then stormed the settlement.

There were an estimated 4,500 people living at or around the Acoma Pueblo in 1598, of whom at least 1,000 were warriors. An estimated 500 men were killed in the battle, along with about 300 women and children. Some 500 prisoners were taken and later sentenced by Oñate to a variety of punishments after a trial was held at San Juan Pueblo. Oñate ordered that every male above the age of twenty-five would have his right foot cut off and be enslaved for a period of twenty years. Twenty-four men suffered amputation. 
Males between the age of twelve and twenty-five were also enslaved for twenty years along with all of the females above the age of twelve.

Most of the remaining natives were dispersed among the residences of government officials or at Franciscan missions. Sixty of the youngest women were deemed not guilty and sent to Mexico City where they were "parceled out among Catholic convents". Two Hopi men were taken prisoner at the pueblo; after each had one of his hands cut off, they were released to spread the word of Spain's might. After the massacre, the town was abandoned out of fear until it was reconstructed again by the Pueblo in 1599.

Alternative interpretations
Whether the whole foot of the massacre's victims were cut off has been subject of scrutiny. In a 2002 letter to the editor in support of El Paso's new statue of Oñate, a commentator specified that original records from the time translate as "cut off the ends of their toes." In another letter from 2017, a commentator stated that, in Onate's personal journal, he specifically refers to the punishment of the Acoma warriors as cutting off "las puntas del pie" (the points of the foot, the toes). These arguments include the idea that the Spanish would not have limited a slave's usefulness by removing their foot.

Aftermath
The punishments inflicted on those who were not killed in combat included amputation of hands and feet or being sold into slavery. When King Philip heard the news of the massacre, and the punishments, Oñate was banished from New Mexico for his cruelty to the natives, and later returned to Spain to live out the remainder of his life. Several Acomas escaped capture by the Spanish in 1599 and by 1601 had rebuilt their pueblo, which still stands.

Present-day Acoma views
The massacre remains a sensitive issue among Puebloans. In 1998, during the 400-year anniversary of Spain's founding of New Mexico colony, a group of Acomas cut off the right foot of the  Equestrian statue of Juan de Oñate in Alcalde, New Mexico. They later issued a statement about the incident: "We took the liberty of removing Oñate's right foot on behalf of our brothers and sister of Acoma Pueblo." The foot was replaced the same year. The statue was removed in June 2020, in the wake of the murder of George Floyd and subsequent protests.

On April 21, 2007, an  statue of Oñate – the largest bronze equestrian statue in the United States – was erected at El Paso, Texas. Members of the Acoma tribe attended the dedication ceremony and protested against the statue's construction.

On June 15, 2020, the statue at Alcalde was removed by Rio Arriba County officials for safekeeping during the George Floyd protests. The County Commission issued a statement that they had not decided the statue's future. La Jornada, another statue of Oñate in Albuquerque, New Mexico, was also taken down during the protests by local government officials, following a protest where a counter-protester shot one of the protesters.

See also

Indian massacre
List of massacres in New Mexico

References

Further reading

Massacres of Native Americans
1599 in New Spain
Battles in New Mexico
Colonial New Mexico
1590s in New Mexico
Native American history of New Mexico
Conflicts in 1599
1599 in North America
Battles involving Spain
Punitive expeditions
C